Hungarian Rhapsody No. 18, S.244/18, in F-sharp minor, is the eighteenth Hungarian Rhapsody composed by Franz Liszt for solo piano. An average performance of the piece lasts three minutes. Along with its predecessor, the seventeenth rhapsody, it is the shortest Hungarian Rhapsody of the set. This rhapsody is subtitled Ungarische Ausstellung in Budapest.

Sources of the melodies 
This Hungarian Rhapsody is based entirely on Liszt's original ideas.

References

External links
 

18

Compositions in F-sharp minor